Laverton railway station is located on the Werribee line in Victoria, Australia. It serves the western Melbourne suburb of Laverton, and opened on 1 July 1886.

At the up end of the station, the tracks diverge. Werribee-bound services take the direct double track route to Newport, while all-stations Altona services operate on the single track Altona loop line to Newport. The loop line reconnects with the direct route just after the demolished station Mobiltown.

The Western standard gauge line passes to the north of Platform 1.

History
Opening on 1 July 1886, Laverton station, like the suburb itself, was named after the pastoral run Laverton, which was settled by Alfred Langhorne in 1836.

In 1968, the former side platform was converted to an island platform, as part of the duplication of the line to Werribee. In 1969, the station building on the island platform (Platforms 2 and 3) was provided.

At about 7:55pm on 12 July 1976, a derailment occurred at the up end of the station, involving a Port Fairy – Melbourne passenger service. After crossing from the east line to the west line, the train derailed and sideswiped the Princes Highway overpass, destroying a number of wood-bodied carriages. There was one fatality in the derailment, and a number of other passengers were injured. It was later revealed that the train diverged through a crossover at excessive speed.

In 1986, the control of all signals and points was transferred to the Newport signal box, although the signal control panel remained within the station building until 2009.

On 1 October 1987, two Hitachi suburban trains collided at the up end of the station, near Laverton Junction, after an up train over ran the Altona loop line and collided with a down train.

In 1998, Laverton was upgraded to a Premium Station.

In May 2008, the Victorian State Government announced, as part of the 2008/2009 State Budget, that Laverton would receive a $92.6 million upgrade, which would include the building of a third platform. The work included the tripling of one kilometre of existing double track, between the Altona loop line and the station. In October 2009, the first section of the footbridge was installed and, on 9 February 2010, the completed bridge was opened to the public. The remainder of these works were completed in mid-2010.

Until June 2015, Geelong and Warrnambool line services passed through the station, but those services now use the Regional Rail Link route via Sunshine, Tarneit and Wyndham Vale.

As part of stage 1 of the Western Rail Plan Geelong Fast Rail project, Laverton is scheduled to be upgraded. Construction is set to begin in 2023.

On the express route between Laverton and Newport stations, former station Galvin has been closed and demolished, and former station Paisley has been closed, and has had its platform access and station building removed.

Platforms and services
Laverton has one island platform with two faces and one side platform. It is served by Werribee line trains.

Platform 1:
  all stations and limited express services to Flinders Street and Frankston

Platform 2:
  all stations and limited express services to Werribee (weekdays only)

Platform 3:
  all stations services to Flinders Street via Altona (weekdays only); all stations services to Werribee (early mornings, evenings and weekends only)

Transport links
CDC Melbourne operates eight routes to and from Laverton station, under contract to Public Transport Victoria:
 : to Sunshine station (shared with Transit Systems Victoria)
 : to Footscray
 : to Footscray
 : to Footscray station
 : to Williamstown
 : to Laverton station (loop service via Laverton North)
 : to Sanctuary Lakes (Point Cook)
 : to Hoppers Crossing station

Transit Systems Victoria operates one route to and from Laverton station, under contract to Public Transport Victoria:
: to Sunshine station (shared with CDC Melbourne)

Gallery

References

External links
 
 Melway map at street-directory.com.au

Former rail freight terminals in Victoria (Australia)
Premium Melbourne railway stations
Railway stations in Melbourne
Railway stations in Australia opened in 1886
Railway stations in the City of Hobsons Bay